"Desert Moon" is a single released by the American rock band Great White in 1991. It is the ninth track off of their album Hooked. During a performance of this song 2003, indoor pyrotechnics created a fire at the Station nightclub which claimed 100 lives.

The Station Nightclub fire
On February 20th, 2003, at 11:00 PM, the band (touring as the name Jack Russell's Great White) began a performance of the song Desert Moon. As the song began, illegal indoor pyrotechnics were set off by the band's manager, Dan Biechele. Within seconds, the polyurethane foam in the drummer's alcove was ignite by the sparks. The fire grew, and within minutes, the entire club had caught on fire. 100 lives were lost as a result including  Ty Longley who had joined the band for the tour

Desert Moon was temporarily removed from tour setlists in the aftermath of the fire. However, since 2010, Jack Russell has stated that the band will resume the song for live shows.

Charts
Desert Moon peaked at 16 on the US Mainstream Rock chart in 1991.

References

External links 
"Desert Moon" music video

1991 singles
Great White songs
Capitol Records singles